The second Hasina cabinet was the Government of Bangladesh during the 9th legislative session of the Jatiya Sangsad following the 2008 general election, and serving from 6 January 2009 until 24 January 2014.

Cabinet reshuffles
 24 January 2009
 Six state ministers were added:
 Shahjahan Mia for Ministry of Religious Affairs
 Abdul Mannan Khan for Ministry of Housing and Public Works
 Muhammad Qamrul Islam for Parliamentary Affairs under the Ministry of Law, Justice & Parliamentary Affairs Ministry
 Shamsul Hoque Tuku for Ministry of Power, Energy and Mineral Resources
 Motahar Hossain for Ministry of Primary and Mass Education 
 Jahangir Kabir Nanak for Ministry of Local Government, Rural Development & Cooperatives
3 May 2009
 Tanjim Ahmad Sohel Taj resigned as the state minister for home affairs.
31 July 2009
Shajahan Khan took charge of the Ministry of Shipping.
Muhammad Afsarul Ameen was transferred to the primary and mass education ministry.
Shamsul Hoque Tuku was made the state minister for home affairs.
Muhammad Enamul Huq was appointed as the state minister for power, energy, and mineral resources.
Hasan Mahmud was made the state minister for forest and environment.
Mostafizur Rahman Fizar was made the state minister for land.
Promode Mankin was made the state minister for cultural affairs.
Mujibur Rahman Fakir was made the state minister for health and family welfare.
Md. Mahbubur Rahman was made the state minister for water resources.
Shirin Sharmin Chaudhury was made the state minister for women and children affairs.
4 December 2011
 Ministry of Railways is bifurcated from Ministry of Communications.
 Ministry of Science and Information and Communication Technology is split into Ministry of Information and Communication Technology (ICT), and Ministry of Science and Technology.
6 December 2011
 Ministry of Science and Information and Communication Technology is split to Ministry of Information and Communication Technology (ICT) and Ministry of Science and Technology.
 Syed Abul Hossain took charge of ICT Ministry and Yafes Osman became Science and Technology minister.
 Obaidul Quader took charge of Ministry of Communications which belonged to Syed Abul Hossain.
 Suranjit Sengupta took charge of the Ministry of Railways.
 Commerce Minister Faruk Khan and Civil Aviation and Tourism Minister GM Quader swapped their portfolios.  
18 April 2012
 Suranjit Sengupta resigned from the Ministry of Railways.
16 September 2012
 Mohiuddin Khan Alamgir was made the minister of home affairs.
 Sahara Khatun was made the minister of posts and telecommunications.
 Rajiuddin Ahmed Raju was made the minister of labour and employment.
 Khandaker Mosharraf Hossain was made the minister of expatriate welfare and overseas employment.
 Mujibul Hoque was made the minister of railways.
 Mostafa Faruque Mohammad was made the minister of information and communication technology (ICT).
 Food and disaster management ministry was bifurcated.
 Abdur Razzak became the minister of food.
 Abul Hassan Mahmood Ali became the minister of disaster management and relief.
 Hasanul Haq Inu was made the information minister.
 Abul Kalam Azad was moved to the minister of cultural affairs.
 Abdul Hyee was made the minister of fisheries and livestock.
 Omor Faruk Chowdhury was made the minister of industries.
18 November 2013
 Amir Hossain Amu
 Tofail Ahmed
 Rashed Khan Menon as the minister of home.
 Anisul Islam Mahmud
 Abul Hassan Mahmood Ali as the foreign minister.
 A.B.M. Ruhul Amin Howlader
 Rowshan Ershad as the minister for health and family welfare.
 Mujibul Haque as the state minister of youth and sports.
 Salma Islam

Cabinet
The cabinet was composed of the following ministers:

State ministers

References

Cabinets established in 2009
Cabinets disestablished in 2014
Sheikh Hasina ministries